Manoj N. Joshi (born 3 September 1965) is an Indian film and television actor of Gujarati origin. After graduating from Sir J. J. School of Arts, he began his career in Marathi theatre, also putting up performances in Gujarati and Hindi theatre. He has also acted in over 70 films since 1998, many of his roles being comedy. 

He acted in TV series including Chanakya, Ek Mahal Ho Sapno Ka, Rau (Marathi), Sangdil, Kabhi Souten Kabhi Saheli, Mura Raska Mai La (Marathi).  He debuted in Sarfarosh (SI Bajju) alongside his brother who played Bala Thakur in the film. His other works include the film Hungama followed by Hulchul, Dhoom, Bhagam Bhag, Phir Hera Pheri, Chup Chup Ke, Bhool Bhulaiyaa and Billo Barber. He played the role of Chanakya in Chakravartin Ashoka Samrat.

In 2018, Joshi was awarded with the Padma Shri. He is the vice-president of the Bombay Art Society.

Filmography

Television serials

Personal life
His father was Navneet Joshi, and his younger brother Rajesh Joshi was an actor too. Rajesh died in 1998. Joshi hails from Adpodara village near Himatnagar in north Gujarat.

Awards 

 Padma Shree Award on 69th Republic Day, 2018

References

External links
 

Living people
Indian male film actors
Indian male television actors
Male actors in Hindi cinema
Indian male soap opera actors
Gujarati theatre
Gujarati people
Male actors in Gujarati-language films
Indian male stage actors
Place of birth missing (living people)
20th-century Indian male actors
21st-century Indian male actors
Recipients of the Padma Shri in arts
Male actors from Gujarat
Best Supporting Actor National Film Award winners
1965 births
Male actors in Marathi television